The 1987 Lieyu massacre occurred on 7 March 1987, at Donggang Bay, Lieyu Island ("Lesser Kinmen" or "Little Quemoy"), Kinmen, Fujian, Republic of China. ROC military officially denied the massacre, and defined it as an incident of “mistaken killings”, hence named as the March 7 Incident or Donggang Incident. There may have been more than nineteen deaths, including several families of ethnic Chinese Vietnamese.

Background

Following the Vietnam War (1955-1975), the Cambodian–Vietnamese War (1978-1979) and the Sino-Vietnamese War (1979), many Indochinese refugees fled abroad. They often had to move several times as local authorities rejected those displaced by the crisis. The Penghu Defense Command  or PDC) cooperated with the "Hai-piao Project" arrangement of the Overseas Community Affairs Council and the Chinese Association for Relief and Ensuing Services to transport 2098 refugees in 45 boats and the "Ren-de Project" to relocate another 6497 refugees by air. Over  12,500 were rescued overall starting in 1975.

The entire Kinmen Archipelago, a group of about twenty islands and islets, were still considered a war zone at the time and were under Martial Law. The Kinmen Defense Command ( or KDC), a Field army level of the Republic of China Army, controlled the islands in an effort to prevent an attack by the People's Liberation Army after the ROC had ended its attempt to retake Mainland China by force in 1970. On 18 December 1978, Deng Xiaoping announced the Chinese economic reform policy, followed by the establishment of 4 special economic zones. The International Port of Xiamen was expanded for commercial traffic on 7 October 1980. 

Both the KDC and the other Matsu Defense Command ( or KDC) on the frontline had guarded the nuclear artillery strike plans targeting neighboring regions during the Cold War, including the strategic Xiamen City even though the effective radius actually covers the ROC's own stationed Dadan and Erdan islands too. It is alleged that a previous nuclear weapons program undertaken since 1967 was forced to stop in 1977 under the pressure of United States and IAEA, but followed by another hidden agenda, a minimized nuclear test succeeded recently at the Jioupeng military field in Pingtung in 1986 after nearly 20 years of research and simulation testing, which was recorded on the US satellite image and questioned later by the director of American Institute in Taiwan, David Dean, in 1988 according to General Hau's Diary.

On 1 April 1982, the Executive Yuan issued the "Pingjing Project" instructing the Ministry of National Defense (MND) the procedure to return the refugees. The MND updated its Standard operating procedure in 1985 but did not actually enforce the new guidance. Instead, the actual practice in the frontline was to kill detainees if a purge failed. They would either bury corpses perfunctorily on the beach or let the tides pull the bodies into the sea. The MND were well aware of the practice, but turned a blind eye. They forged ahead with purposeful "refugee warfare" which endangered national security.

In January 1985, a local Chinese sampan with eight fishermen suffered engine failure and floated ashore at Shi Islet, part of the 473 Brigade's defense region. When the platoon stationed there contacted the KDC for instructions, they were ordered to kill the stranded fishermen. Six died under crossfire but two escaped to a rock cave, kneeling down to beg for mercy. When discovered, those two were pushed off the rock cliff to fall to their death after the KDC reiterated the order to kill the entire crew. A subsequent search of the sampan found only a letter drafted by one of the sailors, a son telling his mother that he had collected sufficient yarn for her to knit a sweater for winter. 

The KDC Commander, General , was promoted to director of the National Security Bureau in Taipei on 15 December, and General  assumed the command. In the following spring, Chao instructed the 158 Division Commander, Major-general Gong Li to construct two propaganda walls - one 3.2m high and 20m long on Dadan, and the other on Erdan - with slogans proclaiming "Three Principles of the People Unify China" shining with neon lights at night until July 1995. Completed in August, 1986, they faced the international seaway of Xiamen Bay, where Xi Jinping (later CCP general secretary) was the Deputy Mayor of Xiamen City.

The 1987 Lieyu massacre was preceded by an incident where a young couple, both teachers, swam from Xiamen to Dadan Island seeking asylum in April, 1986.  The commander of the Dadan Defense Team, Premier Deputy Division Commander of the 158 Lieyu Division, Colonel Chien Yi-hu received the couple and escorted them to the KDC headquarter on the main island of Kinmen. Chien was immediately relieved of his post for violating the directive to "Accept no surrender in the war zone". 

In mid-July 1986, General Zhao inspected the outlying islets of Lieyu, and noticed that the Amphibious Reconnaissance Battalion (ARB-101) took in an unknown person swimming near Dadan after the local garrison failed to expel him away. Zhao was furious condemning the ARB leader, and left in anger, then the Dadan commander called all the units to announce the kill-them-all policy to prevent anybody arriving onshore., so the neighboring Erdan Island commander, Deputy Brigade Commander of the 473 Brigade lieutenant-colonel Zhong who had executed 7 stranded fishermen in 1983 and relayed the KDC's order for the aforementioned killings at Shi Islet before - also summoned all the soldiers to reiterate the order: "Whoever lands on the island must be executed without exception." Soon after, he was promoted to the position of 472 Nantang Brigade Commander and took charge of all the units in the South Lieyu Defense Team,

Massacre

On 6 March 1987, a boat of Vietnamese refugees who had been rejected in Hong Kong earlier arrived in Kinmen to request the political asylum, but General Chao rejected the demand, and ordered an ARB-101 patrol boat to tow away the boat from the shore with a warning not to return in the morning of 7 March. However, for reasons unclear, the information about the boat's presence in the Southern sea was never forwarded to the front line of the coastal defense units, including those in the Lieyu island.

As a seasonal heavy fog appeared on the coast and gradually turned clear in the afternoon, the Vietnamese boat was sighted by an infantry post off the south shore at 16:37, where it had been too close and too late to apply for the indirect fire support by artillery intervention. The local 1st Dashanding Infantry Battalion Commander Major Liu, the 472 Brigade Commander Colonel Zhong and the 158 Division G3 Chief Operation Officer, Colonel Han Jing-yue, arrived at the scene with staff officers.
The 629 Light Artillery Battalion which happened to be taking a field drill practice in the ancient airport on the northeastern beachfront turned around to launch one single star shell lighting up the background horizon sky, but found no invasion force approaching; meanwhile warning shots, followed by expelling shots were fired in sequence as per the procedure steps of Army Rule of Engagement with T57 rifles, .30 Caliber and .50 Caliber machine guns in short range by the 3rd company and the reserve platoons of three companies while another one coming in, summing up to over 200 infantrymen.

The Vietnamese boat was stranded on the sand beach south-west of Donggang Fishery Port (Fort L-05), a sensitive strategic point in front of the mobile positions of M40 recoilless rifles and M30 mortars with the communication transit station nicknamed "04" (homonym to 'You die' in Chinese pronunciation) on hill with a 30-degree angle of blind corner on radar screen by the steep landform in front of the classified 240 mm howitzer M1 (aka. "Black Dragon" or "Nuclear Cannon") railway gun positions of Kinmen Defense Command, and the 155/105 mm artillery battalions of 158 Division. It was hit by crossfire from L-05, L-06 and Fort Fuxing Islet of the 2nd Battalion, plus two M72 LAW (Light Anti-Tank Weapon) rounds by the WPN Company in reinforcement. Armor-piercing shells penetrated through the sky-blue wooden hull without detonation. Three unarmed Vietnamese left the boat, raised their hands, and pled in Chinese, "Don't shoot...!" but were all shot dead.

The local 3rd Dongang Company Commander, Lieutenant Chang, received the order from the brigade commander to dispatch a search team boarding the boat. Two hand grenades were thrown into the boat, then found that all the passengers were Vietnamese refugees with no weapon on board. The passengers said that the vessel had experienced a mechanical failure. Because of the heavy fog, the strong seasonal currents and the rising tide since late afternoon, the boat drifted into the open bay. The surviving passengers and the bodies of the dead were taken out of the boat and placed on the beach, with neither first aid nor any life support supply rendered. Followed by intense telecommunication with the Division Headquarter (DHQ), the commanders at the scene received orders from their superiors – alleged directly by Commander General Chao – to execute the passengers to eliminate all the eyewitnesses. Some received multiple shots when the first bullet had not killed them. Among the bodies piled were elderly people, men, women, one pregnant woman, children, and a baby in a sweater.

The following identification (ID) evidences were collected at the first scene, and enlisted through the P4 (Internal Security) channel of the Political Warfare Department, the KDC and the MND Army Commands HQ: one "Declaration of no possession lost/damaged on boat" issued by the Director of Immigration Office of Hong Kong Alan Carter on 12 December 1986, four copies of the "Notification on the voluntary alternative options to stay under indefinite custody or the assistance to continue navigation" by the British Hong Kong Government on 12 January 1987, several personal ID documents from the French Indochina government, 2 kerosene barrels printed in English with "Singapore" on surface, several Singaporean magazines and Hong Kong newspapers, and a notebook written in English with the last entry on 6 March... None of these evidences was adopted by the prosecutor nor by the judge for unknown reasons later, hence all the court documents named the victims only as the "unknown people".

After collecting the refugee documents, a mother and 3 children (with one held on hand and two running around her) were executed together kneeling down on the beach The last words of the pregnant woman were in English: "Help me... Help my baby...My baby seven months...", before being executed by .45 Caliber handgun shots with two other women, then the battalion operation officer made joke on her dead body and have never shown any remorse during the annual reunions with meals in the later years. A boy got up trying to run but was shot on the shoulder and fell down, until another officer stepped forward to finish him. Major-general Gong arrived at Donggang at 18:30, then Zhong and Liu reunited with Gong again at the DHQ to report to General Chao on phone by the landline at 21:00, and received Chao's praise.

In the morning 07:00 of 8 March 1987, the Medical Platoon of the Battalion Headquarter (BHQ) Company was called in to bury all the bodies at the beach. The platoon members were ordered to execute any surviving refugees. The wounded were buried alive, and those who were still moving or crying were dictated to be killed by military shovels. The entire boat was also instructed to be burned down aside from the only 3-blade propeller non-flammable to gasoline, then all buried in sand to destroy all the evidence right away. The last victim, a young boy being hidden underneath a board cell was also found and executed by order without exception.  The guarding sergeant of the BHQ company overnight counted the bodies as more than nineteen.

Over 30 individual rifles with good routine maintenance records were suddenly reported jammed as non-operational, possibly due to the soldiers unwilling to kill the unarmed civilians, hence jammed their own rifles on purpose. Since some medics defied the direct order of victim execution, the brigade command dispatched the Brigade Headquarter Company (RHQ) commander to take over the BHQ Company as the emergency measure to prevent mutiny and to blockade the site.

Revelation
The native store owner heard the crying of refugees overnight and made a phone call to inform the National Assembly member, Huang Chao-hui in Kaohsiung, but the contact was soon lost. At the time, all civilian and public long-distance phone calls were being routinely monitored by the Communication Supervision Section of Kinmen Defense Command. Nevertheless, the bodies were not buried deeply at the first scene. Influenced by tidal seawater and high temperatures, the bodies soon began to decompose and were dug out by wild dogs from the landfill on the back side of the western hill, and were later reburied collectively in one mound as the second scene on the higher ground next to the tree line. This task was performed by the 1st Company, who had just resumed their posts after winning the annual Army Physical and Combat Competitions in Taiwan. Accounts of ghost sightings prompted villagers to hold religious ceremonies, (and a tiny shrine was built by soldiers for the same reason on the beach next year as well) making it all the more difficult to prevent the spreading of information about the incident. Nonetheless, both scenes along with 04 Station, L-05 Fort, Donggang Port and even the breakwater bank were all demolished critically with bulldozers in name of demining in August 2011. In 2021, the local villagers rebuilt a new shrine beside the path inland in lament till today.

In early May 1987, British Hong Kong newspapers first reported that the refugee boat went missing after leaving the port along the coast for Kinmen, Taiwan. Informed by the overseas office, higher officials questioned the Kinmen Defense Command but got no concrete response; instead, the Command swapped this coast defense battalion from the front line with another reserve battalion in the training base in urgency in order to strengthen the personnel control and communication restriction to prevent further leaking news, and their unit designation codes were also shifted for the following 2 years to confuse outsiders. Twice of "extra bonus" cash summing up to half a month of a captain's salary, $6,000 were also abnormally awarded to the company commanders against the government regulation and ethics on the eve of Dragon boat festival. Until the end of May, recently discharged conscript soldiers from Kinmen began to arrive in Taiwan Proper by the term schedule and finally were able to appeal to the newly founded opposition party, Democratic Progressive Party. The information of the massacre started to spread in Taiwan.

Ten weeks after the massacre, the President of the Republic of China (Taiwan), Chiang Ching-kuo, reacted to concealment by the 158 Division and the Kinmen Defense Command. General Chao Wan-fu, said he was unaware of the event. While being questioned by the Chief of the General Staff, Superior-general Hau Pei-tsun on 20 May, General Chao still lied: "It was just a couple of 'Communist soldiers' (referring to the penetration of People's Liberation Army) being shot in the water", but Chao's statement was obviously unbelievable. Then Superior-general Hau ordered to move the corpses from the beach to a remote hidden slope in front of Fort L-03 (East Cape) on the right, filled with cement and built a concrete training wall on top of it as the military property to prevent any future investigation. General Chao ordered all the 158D officers to be present as participating the cover-up operation. The corpses remain sealed in the final place of the third scene with no mark today.

The witness soldiers at scene were listed to sign the oath by order to maintain silence to guard in secret for life before the departure by the end of conscription service to return home in Taiwan. 

On 5 June 1987, Independence Evening Post was the first Taiwanese newspaper reporting the massacre with the formal questioning by the newly elected Legislative Yuan member Wu Shu-chen, along with the joint written form by PM Chang Chun-hsiung and PM Kang Ning-hsiang from the Democratic Progressive Party to the MND during the general assembly of Legislative Yuan, but received only the respond: "No need to reply!"  Her questions were repeatedly denied by the Military Spokesman, Major-general Chang Hui Yuan, who accused the Congresswoman, Mme. Wu of "sabotaging the national reputation", and claimed it was actually "a Chinese fishing boat being sunk in the sea after ignoring the warnings". The uniformed propaganda was broadcast in the evening news on all public TV channels that night, and since next morning on 6 June, all local newspapers received the government instructions to publicize the press release of the Central News Agency originated from the Military News Agency. 

With the support of Formosan Association for Public Affairs, the United States House of Representatives hence passed the "Taiwan Democracy Resolution" (H.R.1777) on 17 June, calling on the ROC government to end the Martial Law ruling, lift the ban on political parties, accelerate the realization of democracy including the protection of freedom of speech and assembly, and reform the parliament election system for the legitimacy of government; the United States Senate passed the same resolution in December. Though the case study did not directly relate Taiwan to integrate into the neoliberal globalization, it has gradually turned the Taiwanese self-identity against the Chinese unification agenda within the ROC politics, whereas the opposition party supported by the international community took the chance to force Chiang Ching Kuo to lift the martial law and begin the democratization process to distance from the Kuomintang's One China Policy, which developed with the promotion of neoliberal tendency together on Taiwan in a way that would block the attempts to bring the political forces in favor of returning the reunification process into power.。

The case was classified as military secret ever since for 20 years to prevent any further leaking information or the prosecution will apply. The following media reports were censored and the publication were banned by the Nationalist government. Military journalist  of Independence Evening Post on the other hand was sentenced to 1 year and 7 months with a probation period of 3 years in November 1991.

For the same reason, the Hujingtou Battle Museum of Lieyu built since 1989 conspicuously left out any information of this part of history, nor was it documented in the official archive of the Kinmen National Park that took over the beach management later. The official cover-up story of the Chinese fishing boat sunk by one shell of bombardment applied to the public for 13 years, until being uncovered by the publication of <8-year Diary of the Chief of the General Staff (1981-1989)> by Superior-general Hau in 2000. The Government of the Republic of China has made no comment thereafter.

Aftermath

After the scandal was exposed, President Chiang Ching-kuo received a letter from Amnesty International expressing humanitarian concern, and assigned the Chief of General Staff, Superior-general Hau, to investigate this case. On 16 June 1977, President of the Control Yuan (CY),  of the Chinese Nationalist Party (Kuomintang), assigned the committee member Ruo Wen-fu an official investigation task to Lieyu, which General Hau opposed the CY jurisdiction and counted the tour as a pro-governmental "sightseeing visit". After the Ruo submitted the field survey report identical to the KDC's story as expected, however Huang did not approve nor rejected the content, but only signed a word "Read" on 9 March 1988, which rendered the investigation incomplete.

The Minister of National Defense, Cheng Wei-yuan, also arrived in Kinmen, who dispatched a special envoy of the Political Warfare Bureau to conduct the field investigation with excavation discovering the civilian cadavers and eventually solved the criminal case on 23 May.  On 28 May, the Military Police began to detain over 30 officers back to Taiwan to court-martial, including the commanders, corresponding political officers and related staff officers along the 5 levels on the chain of command, whereas 45 officers received the administrative sanction of dishonored transfer. Later on 14 July, Minister Cheng also endorsed the historical decree of President Chiang to end the notorious 38-year-long Martial law ruling period (1948–1987) in Taiwan, except the War Zone Administration on the frontier regions including Kinmen and Matsu Islands remained under the military governing until 7 November 1992. President Chiang further lifted the ban on the divided family members across the Strait to visit their families in China by allowing transfer through a third place, such as Hong Kong, Okinawa or Tokyo, on 2, November.

Nonetheless, the court martial did not follow the 1949 Fourth Geneva Convention and the 1951 Convention Relating to the Status of Refugees to process this case later, and the accused has never been charged for the wrong doings on the international refugees regardless the evidences, but each prosecuted for killing several "unknown people" of the "bandit area" ("", the official term of ROC for the regions under the PRC control, with the extended application to other terms by definition such as the PRC nationals as "bandit people",, the boats from PRC as "bandit boats"...etc) to apply the case only to the domestic criminal codes on 11 September 1987, then the Division Commander Gong, Political Warfare Director, Colonel Chang, and the P4 Section Leader, Lieutenant-colonel Hong were released free in 10 days. The first trial on 30 May 1988 sentenced Commander Zhong to 2 years and 10 months, Liu 2 years and 8 months, Li and Chang 2 year and 6 months, but the prosecutor and all 4 defendants appealed for rehearing, then the MND repealed the sentences back on 9 September as failing to check the facts and reasons favoring the defendants; so the retrial on 19 December 1988 reduced the sentences for Zhong to 1 year and 10 months, Liu to 1 year and 10 months, Li and Chang to 1 year and 8 months, and all commuted with the probation period of 3 years, therefore none of the convicted field commanders was required to spend one day in the prison. they stayed in rank with posts suspended to continue service without pay until the end of term before relocating to the training officer positions whereas their later regular retirement and pension plans were not affected. Brigade Commander Zhong took a senior lead colonel position in a military academy, Army Communication, Electronics and Information School. 

The superior officers received no official punishment, and recovered their military career after President Chiang suddenly died in January 1988. His official funeral was proceeded with his coffin covered by the National Flag, the military salute of the top-ranked generals, Vice-president Wu Den-yih presenting the Commendation Decree of President Ma Ying-jeou, who praises Chao's 50-year career in national security with so-called "loyalty, diligence, bravery, perseverance, intelligence, wisdom, insight and proficiency", whereas "His virtue and conducts have set a good example model for future generations to follow....", and buried in the National Wuzhi Mountain Military Cemetery.。

The development of the nuclear weapons program was eventually exposed by Colonel Chang Hsien-yi, deputy director of the Institute of Nuclear Energy Research at the National Chung-Shan Institute of Science and Technology defecting to the United States in January 1988. A military agent traced Chang's kid after school to locate their home in Washington, D.C. until finally violated the federal witness protection program, further leading to the confrontation of Director Dean with General Hau. Twenty years passed in May 2017, Major Liu Yu, the 1st Battalion Commander, accepted the interview of a military magazine to proclaim that they were executing the direct superior orders, and one officer who killed the refugees was never charged. Ten years later in January 2018, he was invited by the Kinmen National Park administration to re-visit the old posts of South Lieyu Defense Team, and recalled on the beach to the China Times journalist that he "handled" over 100 corpses including the Donggang Incident during his total four years of assignments within 3 KDC terms. On 19 July 2020, Instructor Colonel (Ret.) Liao Nianhan of the ROC Military Academy interviewed the WPN Company Commander, Captain Li Zhong-yan to re-affirm the official testimony that he found all the passengers had died after firing two M72 LAW shells in person, hence nobody out of the boat and no such thing as the following executions. Liao's article dignified the four convicted schoolmates with "the ultimate sublime respect" in comparison to the Atomic bombings of Hiroshima and Nagasaki and Mỹ Lai massacre; however in January 2022, Capt. Li changed his statement in a cross-examination through Facebook online with the other veterans of 158 Division before the lunar new year, then confirmed the boat stranding site and the later execution occurrence on two different locations.

The chilling effect of the massacre made the international refugees extinct from the Kinmen sea area, and the last Jiangmei refugee camp, which had operated for 11 years in Penghu, was shut down on 15 November 1988 due to the policy change; The purge policy on the Chinese fishermen and the surrendered remained the same, as the technique instructed by the new 158D Commander, Major-general Song En-ling, to the G3 staff officers: "Tell the landed people to run or will be shot; then wait after they run to kill them"; however in live practice, the survivors were taken into custody with their head covered for transferring to a temporary lodgment to be expelled later, and the political officers started to repay for the civilian casualties; once the negotiation in the sea for compensation failed, local Chinese fishing boats sometimes gathered around the incident islands to protest. Particularly in July and August 1990, ROC military was criticized by the general public of Taiwanese societies for the cheating and ignorance attitude on the Min Ping Yu No. 5540 and  No. 5502 disasters, therefore the Red Cross Society of China and Red Cross Society of the Republic of China representing both sides signed the Kinmen Agreement to establish the humanitarian repatriation procedures through Kinmen on 12 September.  7 November 1992 marks a historical moment that the provisional martial law control was lifted after 42 years of the War Zone Administration in power, hence KDC returned the governmental and civilian services management to the local county offices; but it was not until 1955 for the first appearance of marine police patrols in the Kinmen and Matsu regions, and the formal establishment of the Water Police Bureau on 15 June 1998 to fully take over the modernized professional law enforcement authority to work with the local police stations and the justice system along the coastline - later reformed as the Coast Guard Administration under the Ocean Affairs Council.

Over 100 years after its establishment in 1911, the Republic of China still doesn't have the Refugee Law to regulate the political asylum process in accordance with the international laws today, not to mention that the Government has never rendered an apology nor any legal compensation to the victim families or the victim country.

On 2 October 2021, the third round of Anonymous hacks on the Chinese government tourism promotion website of the China Culture Center and its archive listed the tenth meme stating "If Taiwan wants to truly become Numbah Wan, it must first redress the 1987 Lieyu Massacre" with a public Wikipedia Commons image same as in this article on the background.

On 13 July 2022, Control Yuan member  submitted the re-investigation report after one year of documentation based on the provided military archive and the interviews of near 20 veteran witnesses including the convicted officers, whose testimonies without passing the lie detection assessment contradict each others with retracted confessions, new evidences and controversies at the first scene though, since the last CY investigation reported 34 years ago was considered as incomplete; then received the approval from the joint committees of the Judicial and Prison Administration Affairs, the Domestic and Ethnic Affairs, the Foreign and Overseas Chinese Affairs, and the National Defense and Intelligence Affairs. The report condemned the KDC for falsifying the facts, the court martial prosecutor and judge for failing their duties of investigation, and the MND for the ignorance throughout 35 years, then recommended the Ministry of Justice re-open this case with a special appeal for the legal re-investigation.

Legacy
 Hushen: The 2019 novel by the retired school principal, Tian-lu Jian analyzes the first scene situation in respect to the humanity concern with his personal experience of service time under Lieyu tunnels, and won the 16th Kinmen Literature Award.
 The Burning Island ("Battleground Massacre"): The 2020 film in production by Hsien-Jer Chu, former member of the 319 Heavy Infantry Division in the  region where similar shooting incidents had occurred earlier, interpreted the history as a mirror to reflect the universal value and won the top prize of 42nd Selection of Excellent Screenplays.
 Lao Dzai: The 2021 short screenplay by Colonel Chou Yi-ching, deputy commander of the Psychological Warfare Team of the Political Warfare Bureau forged this case as the misconduct by a conscription reserve officer from the National Taiwan University, the platoon leader in second lieutenant rank, who volunteered to take the frontline assignment, but ended in covering up with a Senior master sergeant's help, and the refugees received the compensation to leave in peace; Zhou received the top prize of the 55th annual military literature award from the Minister of National Defense, General Chiu Kuo-cheng in person; nonetheless the only conscription officer at scene with the civilian university background led the reserve platoon of 2nd Company from Yang Tsuo arrived at the outskirt later without participating the massacre, and the referred veteran SMSgt had retired, hence no longer available in 1B. Above all, ROC conscription system distributed personnel by random sortition and superior selection after the basic training completed, never with the option to volunteer or choose assignment then.

See also

 February 28 incident
 July 13 Penghu incident
 Capture of Tanker Tuapse
 Kashmir Princess
 Ting Yao-tiao
 Lei Chen
 Bo Yang
 Lin Yi-hsiung
 Chen Wen-chen
 Henry Liu
 China Airlines Flight 334
 Min Ping Yu No. 5540 incident
 Min Ping Yu No. 5202
 Death of Hung Chung-chiu
 Hsiung Feng III missile mishap

References

Further reading

1987 in Taiwan
1987 crimes in Taiwan
March 1987 crimes
1987 murders in Asia
1987 in military history
March 1987 events in Asia
1980s murders in Taiwan
Massacres in 1987
Massacres in Taiwan
Hate crimes
Collective punishment
Cover-ups
Crimes against humanity
Murdered Vietnamese children
Taiwan under Republic of China rule
Cross-Strait conflict
Anti-communism in China
White Terror (Taiwan)
People killed in the Cold War
Massacres committed by Taiwan
History of Taiwan
Taiwan–Vietnam relations
Vietnamese refugees
Vietnamese people murdered abroad
Migrant boat disasters
Kinmen
Deaths by firearm in Taiwan
Aftermath of the Vietnam War